Los Angeles Harbor may refer to:

Port of Los Angeles
Los Angeles Harbor Region
Los Angeles Harbor College
Los Angeles Harbor Light
Port Los Angeles Long Wharf (Santa Monica) 1894 to 1933

See also

Harbor Gateway, Los Angeles